Octamer transcription factors are a family of transcription factors which binds to the "ATTTGCAT" DNA sequence. Their DNA-binding domain is a POU domain.

There are eight Octamer proteins in humans (Oct1–11), which have been renamed according to the different classes of POU domain. Octamer-3/4, also known as POU5F1, is one of the Yamanaka factors, which are critical for the maintenance and self-renewal of embryonic stem cells. On the other hand, Oct-1 and Oct-2 are widely expressed in adult tissues. Oct-7, 8 and 9, also known as "brain factors", are predominantly expressed in the central nervous system during embryonic development. Oct-6 expression is confined to embryonic stem cells and the developing nervous system and skin, while Oct-11 is also involved in skin differentiation.

Human Oct proteins

 Oct-1 - 
 Oct-2 - 
 Oct-3/4 – 
 Oct-6 – 
 Oct-7 – 
 Oct-8 – 
 Oct-9 – 
 Oct-11 –

References

External links
 

POU-domain proteins
Protein families